The Pierce Protein Assay is a method of protein quantification. It provides quick estimation of the protein amount in a given sample.

Protocol 
The assay is separated into three main parts:
preparation of the Diluted Albumin (BSA) Standards,
preparation of the bicinchoninic acid (BCA) working reagent,
and quantification of proteins (using either test tube or microplate procedure).

Advantages and disadvantages

Advantages 
This method is able to detect as low as 25 μg/ml and up to 2000 μg/ml of protein in a 65 ul sample, using standard protocol.
This method may be preferred for samples containing detergents or other reducing agents. 
This method has a fast detection speed and low protein-to-protein variability in comparison to the BCA or Coomassie (Bradford) Assays.
This method has a stable end point.

Disadvantages 
This method has greater protein-to-protein variability than the BCA Assay.

References 

Biochemistry methods
Chemical tests